The K10 transport/localisation element (TLS) is a 44 nucleotide K10 TLS regulatory element from Drosophila melanogaster. K10 TLS is responsible for the transport and anterior localisation of K10 mRNA and acts to establish dorsoventral polarity in the oocyte. It was discovered by Julia Serano.

References

External links 
 

Cis-regulatory RNA elements